The SMP F4 Championship (also known as the F4 NEZ Championship by SMP Racing) was a racing series regulated according to FIA Formula 4 regulations. It was based in the FIA's North European Zone and the Netherlands, and was only open to drivers from these countries. The inaugural season was the 2015 SMP F4 Championship.

After the 2019 season SMP Formula 4 Championship lost FIA certification. The series was relocated to Russia as a support series for the Russian Circuit Racing Series. The drivers competes for Cup of Russian Automobile Federation. There is a plan to revive the championship in 2023 with three stages.

History
Gerhard Berger and the FIA Singleseater Commission launched the FIA Formula 4 in March 2013. The goal of the Formula 4 is to make the ladder to Formula One more transparent. Besides sporting and technical regulations, costs are regulated too. A car to compete in this category may not exceed €30,000 in purchase. A single season in Formula 4 may not exceed €100,000 in costs. The SMP F4 was the one of the second phase Formula 4 championship to be launched. The first phase championships was the Italian F4 Championship and the Formula 4 Sudamericana which started in 2014. The SMP championship was launched by SMP Racing, the Russian Automobile Federation, Koiranen GP and AKK-Motorsport on 22 July 2014. Italian race car constructor Tatuus was contracted to design and build all the cars.

The championship expanded out of the FIA North European Zone for its second season. Following the failure to establish a separate Formula 4 championship in the Benelux region, it incorporated two rounds in the Netherlands, and awarded a Dutch Formula 4 Trophy for these two rounds plus a standalone Formula 4 Festival. MP Motorsport also operated cars alongside Koiranen GP, which ran all drivers in the inaugural season. The championship split, with Koiranen GP leaving from 2019. Koiranen GP creating Formula Academy Finland in 2018, continues as the promoter Formula Academy Finland. SMP F4 Championship continue operate SMP Racing, the Russian Automobile Federation.

Car

The championship featured Tatuus-designed and built cars. The cars were constructed out of carbon fibre and featured a monocoque chassis. The engine was a 1.4 turbo Abarth. This is the same engine as in the Italian F4 Championship.

Champions

Notes

Circuits

Notes

References

External links
 

 
Formula racing series
Recurring sporting events established in 2015
Recurring sporting events disestablished in 2019
Formula 4 series
2015 establishments in Europe
2019 disestablishments in Europe